Riverside Partners is an American investment firm, specializing in private equity, based in Boston.  Riverside Partners develops and manages private equity investment products in middle market healthcare and technology companies.  Founded in 1989, Riverside Partners has managed more than $700 million in investments in over 55 companies.  The firm is currently focused on companies with revenues between $20 –$200 million and with $5 – $25 million of EBITDA.

Investment funds 
Between 1988 and 2011, Riverside Partners has developed five funds investing more than $1 billion in targeted healthcare technology companies.
 Riverside Fund I, LP (closed) 
 Riverside Fund II, LP (closed) 
 Riverside Fund III, LP (closed)
 Riverside Fund IV, LP (closed) – $406,000,000
 Riverside Fund V, LP (closed) - $561,000,000

Investments 
Riverside Partners’ investments in medical device, software and technology companies include more than a dozen current engagement and nine closed sales.
  Applied Precision (acquired)
 Barrier Safe Solutions International (acquired)
 Cushcraft (acquired)
 MicroCal (acquired)
 MicroDental (acquired)
 Quantum Medical Imaging (acquired)
 Rudolph Technologies, Inc. (IPO)
 Vocollect (acquired)
 Dominion Diagnostics 
 Eliassen
 GEM Engineering
 Health Drive
 IPA
 ITC Global
 Logically
 Max Vision
 NDS Surgical Imaging
 Pilgrim Software
 Real Goods Solar
 Tech Valley Communications
 Tegra Medical
 Thinklogical
 Weblocalize

Key employees
 David Belluck, General Partner
 Brian Guthrie, General Partner
 John Lemelman, General Partner
 Steve Kaplan, General Partner
 Kevin Sullivan, Chief Financial Officer

References

External links
 Company website

Private equity firms
Companies based in Boston
Financial services companies established in 1989